Events in the year 2023 in Belgium.

Incumbents 

 Monarch: Philippe
 Prime Minister: Alexander De Croo

Events 
 10 March – Belgium banned TikTok from all federal government work devices over cybersecurity, privacy, and misinformation concerns.

Scheduled 

 14 January – Belgium in the Eurovision Song Contest 2023

Sports 

 4 February – 19 March: 2023 Rugby Europe Championship
 11 – 15 July 2023: 2023 European Amateur Team Championship

Deaths 

 5 January – Pierre Joassin, 74, film director and screenwriter (Maigret, Josephine, Guardian Angel)

References 

 
Belgium
Belgium
2020s in Belgium
Years of the 21st century in Belgium